Someone Out There is the second studio album by English singer and songwriter Rae Morris, released on 2 February 2018 through Atlantic Records. Five singles have been released from the album: "Reborn", "Do It", "Atletico (The Only One)", "Someone Out There" and "Dancing with Character".

Critical reception

Someone Out There received generally positive reviews from music critics. At Metacritic, the album received an average score of 74 out of 100 based on six reviews, indicating "generally favorable reviews". In The Guardian, critic Laura Snapes wrote positively about Morris that she achieved something unusual for an artist on a major label, "she has made a pop album with an innate experimental sensibility."

Singles
"Reborn" was released as the album's lead single on 1 June 2017 along with its music video. "Do It" followed as the second single on 15 September 2017, with "Atletico (The Only One)" being released as the third single on 22 November 2017. The title track of the album, "Someone Out There" was sent to radios on 23 March 2018. The last track of the album, "Dancing with Character" was released on 18 October 2018 as a fifth single along with a music video.

Track listing
Credits adapted from Tidal.

Charts

Release history

References

2018 albums
Albums produced by Ariel Rechtshaid
Albums produced by Fryars
Atlantic Records albums
Rae Morris albums
Electronic albums by English artists